Otites atripes is a species of picture-winged fly in the genus Otites of the family Ulidiidae.

References

atripes
Insects described in 1858
Diptera of Europe